Tugali stewartiana is a species of medium-sized sea snail or limpet, a marine gastropod mollusc in the Family Fissurellidae, the keyhole limpets and slit limpets.

References

 Powell A W B, William Collins Publishers Ltd, Auckland 1979 

Fissurellidae
Gastropods of New Zealand
Gastropods described in 1939
Taxa named by Arthur William Baden Powell
Endemic fauna of New Zealand
Endemic molluscs of New Zealand